Keely Small is an Australian middle-distance runner. She won the gold medal in the women's 800 metres event at the 2018 Summer Youth Olympics and at the 2019 Pacific Games.

Career 

She competed in the women's 800 metres event at the 2018 Commonwealth Games held in Gold Coast, Australia. In this event she did not advance to compete in the final. Later that year, she won the gold medal in the girls' 800 metres event at the 2018 Summer Youth Olympics held in Buenos Aires, Argentina. She was also her country's flagbearer during the opening ceremony of the 2018 Summer Youth Olympics.

In 2019, at the Pacific Games held in Samoa, she won the gold medal in the women's 800 metres event.

Personal life 

Alpine skier Greta Small is her cousin. Greta carried the Australian flag during the opening ceremony of the 2012 Winter Youth Olympics held in Innsbruck, Austria.

References

External links 
 

Living people
Year of birth missing (living people)
Place of birth missing (living people)
Australian female middle-distance runners
Commonwealth Games competitors for Australia
Athletes (track and field) at the 2018 Commonwealth Games
Athletes (track and field) at the 2018 Summer Youth Olympics
Youth Olympic gold medalists for Australia
Youth Olympic gold medalists in athletics (track and field)
21st-century Australian women